Acanthacris is a genus of African grasshoppers in the subfamily Cyrtacanthacridinae.

Species
The following species are included:
Acanthacris aithioptera Mungai, 1987
Acanthacris deckeni (Gerstaecker, 1869)
Acanthacris elgonensis Sjöstedt, 1932
Acanthacris ruficornis (Fabricius, 1787) - type species (as Gryllus ruficornis Fabricius = subsp. A. r. ruficornis)

The genus Acanthacris belongs to subfamily Cyrtacanthacridinae (W.F. Kirby, 1902), of locusts (Acrididae) and other grasshoppers: order Orthoptera. 

A. ruficornis is distributed throughout Africa and parts of the Arabian Peninsula, as well as in southern Spain.  Other species are recorded from mainland Africa.

References

Acrididae genera
Taxa named by Boris Uvarov